Amith Thenuka Vidanagamage  is a Sri Lankan politician, a member of the Parliament of Sri Lanka. He represents the Sri Lanka Podujana Peramuna. He previously served as the Minister of Sports and Youth Affairs. Vidanagame has an extensive background in sports having represented College in Rugby, Cricket, Water Polo and Swimming and has won colors in Water Polo. He is a graduate of the University of Wyoming with a degree in Anthropology and has pursued post-graduate programs at Stanford University in Development Economics and Artificial Intelligence

References

Members of the 14th Parliament of Sri Lanka
Members of the 16th Parliament of Sri Lanka
Sri Lanka Freedom Party politicians
United People's Freedom Alliance politicians
Sri Lanka Podujana Peramuna politicians
1973 births
Living people
Sinhalese politicians
Alumni of Trinity College, Kandy